Edward Victor Siegler (August 14, 1881 – January 28, 1942) was an American gymnast and track and field athlete who competed in the 1904 Summer Olympics. In 1904 he won the bronze medal in the team event. He was also 12th in athletics' triathlon event, 32nd in gymnastics all-around event and 53rd in gymnastics' triathlon event.

References

External links
 profile

1881 births
1942 deaths
Athletes (track and field) at the 1904 Summer Olympics
Gymnasts at the 1904 Summer Olympics
Olympic track and field athletes of the United States
Olympic bronze medalists for the United States in gymnastics
American male artistic gymnasts
Medalists at the 1904 Summer Olympics
American male triathletes